Laura duPont was the defending champion but was upset in her first match against Kate Latham.
College amateur Dana Gilbert won the title beating Viviana González in the final.

Seeds
A champion seed is indicated in bold text while text in italics indicates the round in which that seed was eliminated.

Draw

Finals

Top half

Section 1

Section 2

Bottom half

Section 3

Section 4

References

External links

U.S. Clay Court Championships
1978 U.S. Clay Court Championships